Manor Park was the former stadium of Nuneaton Borough A.F.C. 22,114 spectators packed into the ground for an FA Cup tie against Rotherham United in 1967. The club moved away from Manor Park at the beginning of the 2007–08 season to a new home at Liberty Way which they share with Nuneaton R.F.C. In 2008 Manor Park was demolished and housing was built on the site.

Manor Park staged the first ever official home match of the England women's national team on 23 June 1973, an 8–0 victory over Scotland watched by a crowd of 1,310.

References

Defunct football venues in England
Nuneaton Borough F.C.
Sports venues in Warwickshire
Sports venues demolished in 2008
Demolished buildings and structures in England
Demolished sports venues in the United Kingdom
Sports venues in Nuneaton